Foolish Plans is a 2016 Chinese adventure comedy film directed by Jiang Tao and starring Wang Ning, Xiu Rui, Wang Zijian, Wang Ou, Liu Yase and Chen Yang.  It was released in China by Beijing Juhe Yinglian Media and in North America by United Entertainment Partners on July 8, 2016.

Plot

Three down on their luck best friends search for love and good fortune. What began as an arranged marriage scheme with their boss's pregnant mistress spirals into a hilarious all-out caper involving a possible murder, money laundering and a missing $100 million check.

Cast
Wang Ning
Xiu Rui
Wang Zijian
Wang Ou
Liu Yase
Chen Yang
Wang Yanhui

References

Chinese adventure comedy films
2010s adventure comedy films
2016 comedy films